Krishna Leele is a 2000 Indian Kannada-language drama film directed by D. Rajendra Babu and produced by Rockline Venkatesh. The film stars Shiva Rajkumar, Ananth Nag, and debutant Suvalakshmi.

The film was a remake of director Agathiyan's Tamil film Gokulathil Seethai (1996).

Cast 
 Shiva Rajkumar as Krishna
 Ananth Nag 
 Suvalakshmi as Seetha
 Umashree
 Mohan
 Mandeep Roy
 Ashalatha
 Lakshman

Soundtrack 
The soundtrack of the film was composed by V. Manohar who wrote the lyrics with K. Kalyan and R. N. Jayagopal.

References

External links 
 Movie portal

2000 films
2000s Kannada-language films
Indian drama films
Kannada remakes of Tamil films
Films scored by V. Manohar
Films directed by D. Rajendra Babu
2000 drama films